Hon'inbō Shugen (本因坊 秀元, 1854 – 5 September 1917) was a Japanese professional go player. He was twice head of the Hon'inbō house, being both the sixteenth and the twentieth head.

Biography
While not an outstanding exponent of the game by the standards set earlier in the 19th century, Shugen twice took over Honinbo leadership, essentially as a stopgap leader. On the first occasion, the go world was coping with the declining interest in the game produced by the Meiji Restoration.

External links
 Page at Sensei's Library

1854 births
1917 deaths
Japanese Go players